Thomas Marshall was an English professional footballer who played as a centre forward for  Bolton Wanderers and Burnley around the turn of the twentieth century.

References

Year of birth unknown
English footballers
Association football wingers
Bolton Wanderers F.C. players
Burnley F.C. players
English Football League players
Year of death missing